Dennis James Coffey (born November 11, 1940) is an American guitarist. He was a studio musician for many soul and R&B recordings, and is well known for his 1971 Top 10 hit single "Scorpio".

Biography
Coffey learned to play guitar at the age of thirteen, in the Michigan Upper Peninsula town of Copper City. In 1955, as a fifteen-year-old sophomore at Detroit's Mackenzie High School, Dennis played his first record session - backing Vic Gallon in "I'm Gone", on the Gondola record label. In the early 1960s he joined The Royaltones who had had hits with "Poor Boy" in 1958 and "Flamingo Express" in 1961. The Royaltones played sessions with other artists including Del Shannon.

By the late 1960s as a member of the Funk Brothers studio band, Coffey played on dozens of recordings for Motown Records, and introduced a hard rock guitar sound to Motown record producer Norman Whitfield's recordings, including distortion, Echoplex tape-loop delay, and wah-wah: most notably heard on "Cloud Nine",  "Ball of Confusion (That's What the World Is Today)", and "Psychedelic Shack" by The Temptations. He played on numerous other hit records of the era: Edwin Starr's "War",  Diana Ross & The Supremes' "Someday We'll Be Together", and Freda Payne's "Band of Gold".

In 1971, Coffey recorded "Scorpio" which was a million selling instrumental single that peaked in the US at number nine on the Billboard Hot Soul Singles chart and at number six on the Billboard Hot 100. The instrumental track featured the former Motown "funk brother", Bob Babbitt on bass.  On January 8, 1972 Coffey became the first white artist to perform on the television show Soul Train, playing "Scorpio". "Scorpio" received a gold disc awarded by the Recording Industry Association of America on December 9, 1971.

The follow-up in 1972 was "Taurus", both credited to Coffey and the Detroit Guitar Band. Since then, he has recorded several solo albums, most of them for the Sussex and Westbound labels.  While at Sussex Records Coffey arranged and produced along with Mike Theodore the million selling "Nice To Be With You" by the group Gallery. In addition, Coffey scored the blaxploitation film, Black Belt Jones (1974).

Coffey was interviewed in the 2002 film, Standing in the Shadows of Motown, which told the story of Funk Brothers and explained that he had sold his Fender Stratocaster to buy a Gibson Firebird after he heard Eddie Willis of Funk Brothers play it during a Motown session.

In 2004, he published a memoir, Guitars, Bars and Motown Superstars.

In 2008, he co-produced the Carl Dixon sessions at Studio A, Dearborn Heights, Michigan. Four tracks were recorded featuring some of the Funk Brothers including Uriel Jones, Bob Babbitt, Coffey and Ray Monette, plus other distinguished Detroit session musicians. Spyder Turner, Pree and Gayle Butts were vocalists on the session. The session was arranged by David J. Van De Pitte.

On April 26, 2011 (April 25 outside the US) Coffey released his self-titled album, consisting of new songs and new versions of songs which originally featured Coffey's distinctive guitar work. Promotion for the album  included an international tour, kicking off with several appearances at SXSW. Singer-songwriter Kendra Morris accompanied him on tour, performing backing vocals.

Dennis was a constant performer in his hometown Detroit. He performed at the Detroit Jazz Concert, the Concert of Colors 
promoted by Don Was and recorded on the Blue Note label. His performances at the Legendary Morey Baker's Keyboard Lounge and other venues included notables; Steve Adams, Drew Schultz, Danny Tyrell and others.

In 2012, Coffey was interviewed on the PBS program History Detectives, about the authenticity of an old Ampeg B-15 amplifier with the stenciled name of fellow Funk Brothers member bassist James Jamerson.

Along with Mike Theodore, Coffey discovered the folk-rock singer-songwriter Sixto Rodriguez, who is the subject of the 2012 Oscar-winning film Searching for Sugar Man in which Coffey appears. Coffey played lead guitar on Rodriguez's first album Cold Fact (1970).

Dennis Coffey was inducted into the Michigan Rock and Roll Legends Hall of Fame as a member of the Funk Brothers in 2010 and as a solo artist in 2018.

Discography

Albums

Singles

Notable publications
Guitars, Bars, and Motown Superstars (University of Michigan Press, 2004)

References

Further reading
 Dennis Coffey in-depth interview by Pete Lewis, 'Blues & Soul' May 2011

External links
 Coffey official website
 Carl Dixon/Bandtraxs web site

American funk guitarists
American soul guitarists
American male guitarists
American session musicians
1940 births
Living people
The Funk Brothers members
Guitarists from Detroit
20th-century American guitarists
20th-century American male musicians
Mackenzie High School (Michigan) alumni